Irene DeBari is an American television actress. In some of her earlier appearances she is credited under the alternative name Irena Du Barry. It was under this previous name that she took the role of Rosa Calletano, wife of Lieutenant Ray Calletano, in the TV drama Hill Street Blues. She has also been credited as Irene De Bari and (in her earliest work) Irene Rosetti.

Her professional acting career began in 1967, and she remains active and working.

External links
 

Place of birth missing (living people)
Year of birth missing (living people)
Living people
American television actresses
21st-century American women